The Eddleman Pro Tennis Classic is a defunct ATP Challenger Tour tennis tournament played from 1991 until 2003. It was held at the Brook Highland Racquet Club in Birmingham, Alabama, United States, and was played on outdoor clay courts. The Eddleman U.S. Clay Court Championships took the place of the Challenger event in 1994.

Results

Singles

Doubles

See also
 U.S. Men's Clay Court Championships

References

External links
 ITF Results Archive

ATP Challenger Tour
Clay court tennis tournaments
Defunct tennis tournaments in the United States
Sports in Birmingham, Alabama